Harry Bell (September 21, 1860 – November 10, 1938) was a United States Army Captain received the Medal of Honor for actions during October 17, 1899, during the Philippine–American War for leading a charge against a superior number of the enemy.

Biography
Harry Bell was born in Milwaukee, Wisconsin to Adam Bell and Katherina Matilda (Boettinger) Bell.

In 1899 he was living in Minneapolis, Minnesota when joined the 36th United States Volunteer Infantry and was promoted to the rank of captain.  The regiment was posted to the Philippines the same year.

On October 17, 1899 he engaged in the action at Porac on the island of Luzon, for which he later received the Medal of Honor.

After leaving the Army, he married Kate Reimers on 3 August 1904 in Davenport, Iowa and they had 3 sons.

As of 1910 he worked at Fort Leavenworth, Kansas where he was an electrician and, as of 1920, he was the chief clerk of the military prison there.  By 1930 he had separated from his wife and was working as a government clerk in Columbus, Ohio.

He was living in Proviso Township, Cook County, Illinois where he died in 1938 at the age of 78.

Bell is buried in the Fort Leavenworth National Cemetery.

Medal of Honor citation
Rank and Organization: Captain, 36th Infantry, U.S. Volunteers. Place and Date: Near Porac, Luzon, Philippine Islands, October 17, 1899. Entered Service At: Minneapolis, Minn. Born: September 21, 1860, Milwaukee, Wis. Date of Issue: March 8, 1902.

Citation:

Led a successful charge against a superior force, capturing and dispersing the enemy and relieving other members of his regiment from a perilous position.

See also

 List of Medal of Honor recipients
 List of Philippine-American War Medal of Honor recipients

Notes

References
 
 
 

1860 births
1938 deaths
United States Army Medal of Honor recipients
Military personnel from Milwaukee
United States Army officers
American military personnel of the Philippine–American War
Philippine–American War recipients of the Medal of Honor